The 1985–86 season was the 84th season in which Dundee competed at a Scottish national level, playing in the Scottish Premier Division. Dundee would finish in 6th place for the second consecutive season. Dundee would also compete in both the Scottish League Cup and the Scottish Cup, where they were knocked out of the League Cup by Hamilton Academical in the 3rd round, and were defeated by Aberdeen in the quarter-finals of the Scottish Cup.

During this season, the club would incorporate a single stripe onto their classic navy shirts, diagonally split displaying red and white. This season would be most memorable for Dundee's final game of the league season, where a late double from substitute Albert Kidd would help Dundee defeat Heart of Midlothian, inadvertently ending their title hopes and allowing Celtic to win instead, resulting in Kidd becoming a cult figure for the Celtic fanbase, as well as for those of Hibernian faith.

Scottish Premier Division 

Statistics provided by Dee Archive.

League table

Scottish League Cup 

Statistics provided by Dee Archive.

Scottish Cup 

Statistics provided by Dee Archive.

Player statistics 
Statistics provided by Dee Archive

|}

See also 

 List of Dundee F.C. seasons

References

External links 

 1985–86 Dundee season on Fitbastats

Dundee F.C. seasons
Dundee